Events from the year 1430 in Ireland.

Incumbent
Lord: Henry VI

Events
 Ulick Ruadh Burke , became 5th lord of Clanricarde (died 1485)
 Inch Castle on the southern tip of Inch Island in County Donegal was constructed.

Births

Deaths
 William mac Ulick Burke, the 4th Clanricarde

References

 
1430s in Ireland
Ireland
Years of the 15th century in Ireland